Collinder 140 is a nearby open cluster of stars in the constellation Canis Major. It was first catalogued in 1751 by the French astronomer Nicolas Louis de Lacaille, who described it as a "nebulous star cluster". It was catalogued again by the Swedish astronomer Per Collinder in 1931. Fitzgerald et al. (1980) describe it as "a young extended cluster" and note that it is not obviously a cluster and may instead be a mere grouping of stars that formed together.

The cluster has a density of 0.21 solar masses per cubic parsec; roughly double the density of stars near the Sun. It is about 20 million years old, and may have been created from the same interstellar cloud that formed NGC 2516 and NGC 2547.

References

Open clusters
17511231